Gipps County is one of the 141 Cadastral divisions of New South Wales.

Gipps County was named in honour of the Governor of New South Wales, Sir George Gipps (1791–1847.

Parishes within this county
A full list of parishes found within this county; their current LGA and mapping coordinates to the approximate centre of each location is as follows:

References

Counties of New South Wales